The Kingman Terminal Railroad operates about 3 miles of track at the Kingman Industrial Park north of Kingman, Arizona. It is owned by Patriot Rail Company and its reporting mark is KGTR.

References

Arizona railroads
Patriot Rail Company